James Elsby (1 August 1928 – 7 September 1987) was an English footballer. A full-back, he played 12 games in the Football League for Port Vale in a seven-year career at the club from 1948 to 1955. He helped the club to win the Third Division North title in 1953–54. His nephew, Ian Elsby, also played for Port Vale.

Career
Elsby joined Port Vale as an amateur in November 1948 and signed as a professional in May 1949. He made his debut in a goalless draw with Crystal Palace at The Old Recreation Ground on 7 May 1949, as Bill McGarry was rested. This was his only appearance of the 1948–49 season. He played two Third Division South games in 1949–50. He also played twice in April 1953, as Stan Turner was rested, as manager Freddie Steele led the club to a second-place finish in the Third Division North in 1952–53. He filled in for seven games for Derek Tomkinson and Turner in 1953–54, as the "Valiants" finished the campaign as champions. He did not feature at Vale Park in the Second Division 1954–55 campaign, and moved on to Wereton Queen's Park.

Career statistics
Source:

Honours
Port Vale
Football League Third Division North: 1953–54

References

Sportspeople from Newcastle-under-Lyme
English footballers
Association football fullbacks
Port Vale F.C. players
English Football League players
1928 births
1987 deaths